Micruroides is a genus of venomous coral snake in the family Elapidae. The genus is monotypic, containing only the species Micruroides euryxanthus.

Micruroides euryxanthus, commonly known as the Sonoran coral snake, western coral snake or the Arizona coral snake, is endemic to northwestern Mexico and the southwestern United States.

Description

The color pattern consists of broad, alternating rings of red and black, separated by narrower rings of white or yellow. Markings become paler as they reach the belly. The head is black, the black extending to the posterior border of the parietals.

The smooth dorsal scales are arranged in 15 rows at midbody. The ventrals number 214–241. The anal plate is divided. The subcaudals number 21–34, and are divided (paired).

Micruroides euryxanthus resembles Micrurus fulvius. However, the white or yellow rings are broader than in M. fulvius, and there are fewer black rings on the tail, usually only 2. Also, the first ring on the body (the first ring behind the white or yellow ring on the back of the head) is red, whereas in Micrurus fulvius it is black.

Venom
The venom of M. euryxanthus is neurotoxic and extremely potent, but no fatalities have been reported.

Habitat
In Arizona it is abundant in rocky upland desert.

Behavior
The Sonoran coral snake usually stays underground and comes out at night, but can also appear during and after rains.

Defense
When startled, frightened, or threatened, M. euryxanthus will hide its head under its body and raise and tightly curl its tail. While in this posture, it will "fart": snakes do not have an anal cavity in the sense that humans and most mammals do, but rather a tract that allows for both disposal of waste and for laying of eggs in females. Instead, it will forcibly and noisily emit gas from its cloaca, a behavior known as "cloacal popping", and predictably this phenomenon has a very unpleasant smell.

Diet
The Arizona coral snake preys upon small snakes, predominantly Rena (snake), but also Sonora, and Tantilla. It will also eat small lizards such as skinks.

Reproduction
Like all other species of New World coral snakes (genera Leptomicrurus and Micrurus), Micruroides euryxanthus is oviparous.

Geographic range 

Micruroides euryxanthus is found from central Arizona and southwestern New Mexico to Mazatlán in southern Sinaloa. Isolated populations are also found in the Chocolate Mountains, La Paz County, western Arizona and on Tiburón Island in the Gulf of California.

Subspecies
Three subspecies are recognized, including the nominotypical subspecies.

Micruroides euryxanthus australis 
Micruroides euryxanthus euryxanthus 
Micruroides euryxanthus neglectus 

Nota bene: A trinomial authority in parentheses indicates that the subspecies was originally described in a genus other than Micruroides.

References

Further reading
Behler JL, King FW (1979). The Audubon Society Field Guide to North American Reptiles and Amphibians. New York: Alfred A. Knopf. 743 pp., 657 color plates. . (Micruroides euryxanthus, pp. 680–681 + Plate 616).
Kennicott R (1860). "Descriptions of New Species of North American Serpents in the Museum of the Smithsonian Institution, Washington". Proc. Acad. Nat. Sci. Philadelphia 12: 328–338. (Elaps euryxanthus, new species, pp. 337–338).
Roze JA (1974). "Micruroides, M. euryxanthus ". Catalogue of American Amphibians and Reptiles (163): 1–4. (Micruroides euryxanthus neglectus).
Wright AH, Wright AA (1957). Handbook of Snakes of the United States and Canada. Ithaca and London: Comstock. 1,105 pp. (in 2 volumes) (Family Elapidae, p. 885; Genus Micruroides, pp. 885–886; Micruroides euryxanthus, pp. 886–890, Figures 253–255 + Map 63 on p. 891).
Zweifel RG, Norris KS (1955). "Contributions to the herpetology of Sonora, Mexico: Descriptions of new subspecies of snakes (Micruroides euryxanthus and Lampropeltis getulus) and miscellaneous collecting notes". Amer. Midland Naturalist 54: 230–249. (Micruroides euryxanthus australis, new subspecies, p. 238.)

Elapidae
Monotypic snake genera
Taxa named by Karl Patterson Schmidt
Reptiles described in 1860